The Fazlehaq College Mardan is a residential college in Mardan, Pakistan. The students are called 'The 'HAQS', and the college motto is 'Know Thyself.

History
The college was founded in 1983 by General Fazle Haq, governor of Khyber Pakhtunkhwa and educationalist Abdul Ali Khan, son of politician Bacha Khan and brother of poet and philosopher Abdul Ghani Khan was its first principal. Classes began on May 2, 1985, under the leadership of Ali Khan.

Schools
The college is divided into three schools. These include the Preparatory School, the Junior School and the Senior School. Each school has its own head teacher, its own set of teaching staff and its own motto.

Preparatory School
The Preparatory School includes students from P-0 through P-5, the equivalent of Kindergarten through 5th grade. The Head-Mistress and the teaching staff are mostly female. The students of the Preparatory School reside in hostels named Karlanr House and Abdali House, after the forefathers of the Pukhtoon that inhabit the area.

Junior School
The Junior School includes students from F-1 through F-3, the equivalent of 6th through 8th grade. Male teachers make up a majority of the teaching staff. Students reside in the Sir Sahibzada House, named after Sir Sahibzada Abdul Qayyum first Chief Minister of the Khyber-Pakhtunkhwa, and founder of the historic Islamia College and the University of Peshawar.

Senior School
The Senior School has two streams of study: Metric and GCE.

Matric, equivalent to 9th and 10th grade, leads to the Matriculation Examination of the Pakistani scheme of studies. GCE, denoted as F-4 and F-5 (also equivalent to 9th and 10th grade) lead to the General Certificate of Education (GCE) Ordinary Level Examination.

The college offers intermediate classes for students after Matriculation, equivalent to 11th and 12th grade, during which students can choose between pre-medical and pre-engineering courses. A-Level classes have also been introduced.

Some of the students in the Senior School reside in the Sher Shah Suri House, named after an Afghan Warrior. Other students reside in Khushal House, named after the warrior poet Khushal Khan Khattak. These students stay in the house during class hours, returning home after classes.

Student life
The Fazlehaq College Mardan provides sports and recreational facilities, including cricket and hockey grounds, two large swimming pools, a gymnasium with an indoor basketball court, squash courts, basketball and badminton courts, a boating pond, tennis lawns, softball and baseball pitches and a gymnastics squad.

Each student is required to join one of the many clubs and societies.

An annual picnic is held for the Preparatory School. An annual 2–3 day hiking and camping trip for the Junior and Senior Schools is hosted at a base camp in Lalkoo, Upper Swat. The Mountaineering Club also goes on a mountaineering exercise to the northern areas of Pakistan during summer vacation, But due to some reasons this tradition is discounted since long ago.

Images

External links
 Official website
 - Facebook page

Universities and colleges in Khyber Pakhtunkhwa
Mardan